The Battle of Saint-Quentin of 1557, was a decisive engagement of the Italian War of 1551–1559 between the Kingdom of France and the Spanish Empire, at Saint-Quentin in Picardy. A Habsburg Spanish force under Duke Emmanuel Philibert of Savoy defeated a French army under the command of Louis Gonzaga, Duke of Nevers, and Anne de Montmorency, Duke of Montmorency.

Battle 
The battle took place on the Feast Day of St. Lawrence 10 August. Philibert, with his English allies, had placed St. Quentin under siege. Montmorency with a force of around 26,000 men marched to St. Quentin to relieve the city. Facing a force twice their size, Montmorency attempted to gain access to St. Quentin through a marsh, but a delayed French withdrawal allowed the Spanish to defeat the French and capture Montmorency.

During the battle the Saint-Quentin collegiate church was badly damaged by fire.

Aftermath
After the victory over the French at St. Quentin, "the sight of the battlefield gave Philip a permanent distaste for war"; he declined to pursue his advantage, withdrawing to the Spanish Netherlands to the north, where he had been the Governor since 1555. In 1558, the Habsburgs won again at the Battle of Gravelines. The Treaty of Cateau-Cambresis ended the war in 1559.

Notable participants
The Frenchman Martin Guerre fought in the Spanish ranks and his leg was amputated.
During his long absence, another soldier famously impersonated him in Guerre's village until he returned in 1560.

Feast of Saint Lawrence 
Being of a grave religious bent, Philip II was aware that 10 August is the Feast of St Lawrence, a Roman deacon who was roasted on a gridiron for his Christian beliefs. Hence, in commemoration of the great victory on St Lawrence’s Day, Philip sent orders to Spain that a great palace in the shape of a gridiron should be built in the Guadarrama Mountains northwest of Madrid. Known as El Escorial, it was finally completed in 1584.

In culture
 ("It became the one of St. Quentin") is a Spanish proverbial phrase to describe a big dispute.

Notes

References

Sources

1557 in France
Battles of the Italian Wars
Battles involving England
Battles involving France
Battles involving Spain
Conflicts in 1557
Battles involving Savoy
Battles in Hauts-de-France
Italian War of 1551–1559